Genesis Live is the first live album from the English rock band Genesis, released on 20 July 1973 on Charisma Records. Initially recorded for radio broadcast on the American rock program King Biscuit Flower Hour, the album is formed from the recordings of shows at Free Trade Hall, Manchester and De Montfort Hall, Leicester in February 1973 during the band's tour supporting their fourth studio album Foxtrot (1972).

Genesis Live is the band's first album to enter the top 10 in the UK, reaching No. 9. Following its US release in 1974, it peaked at No. 105.

History 
Genesis were persuaded by their label, Charisma Records, to release Genesis Live as a budget-priced title to mark time while the band recorded Selling England by the Pound in mid-1973. The group's manager, Tony Stratton Smith said that the low price would allow it to be sold in stores such as Woolworths and WHSmith. Genesis Live was issued in the US several months after Selling Englands release, which upset Gabriel as the album included songs from their old live sets and was quickly recorded with little care given to the quality of the recordings. When Gabriel reluctantly agreed to have the album released, part of the deal was that it would not be issued in the US.

The album was recorded when the band was touring in support of Foxtrot, by the Pye Mobile Recording Unit, engineer Alan Perkins; all tracks were recorded at De Montfort Hall, Leicester, England on  except for "The Return of the Giant Hogweed", which was recorded at the Free Trade Hall in Manchester, England on the previous day. These recordings were originally made for the U.S. radio show King Biscuit Flower Hour, though they were never broadcast. John Burns mixed the multi-track tapes in July 1973.

A handful of early radio promotional double-LP test pressings were created which included a 23-minute version of "Supper's Ready" from the Leicester show. This album's running order was "Watcher of the Skies", "The Musical Box", "Get 'Em Out by Friday", "Supper's Ready", "The Return of the Giant Hogweed", "The Knife", and included between-song patter by Gabriel.  "Supper's Ready" was not included in the officially released version, even though the front cover photograph was taken during a live performance of the song (with Gabriel donning the "Magog" mask). A live recording of "Supper's Ready" from later that same year was released on 1998's 4-CD boxed set, Genesis Archive 1967–75. However, Gabriel re-recorded some vocals for that release.

A remastered version was released on CD in 1994 by Virgin in Europe and Atlantic in the US and Canada. A remixed version was included in 2009's Genesis Live 1973–2007 set, also released by Virgin in Europe and Atlantic in the U.S. and Canada.

A surrealistic short story by Peter Gabriel was printed on the back cover of the album. William Friedkin, who directed the film The Exorcist, read the story and was interested in possibly working with Gabriel on a film.  Discussions with Friedkin took Gabriel away from the 1974 recording of The Lamb Lies Down on Broadway, his final album with the group.

 Critical reception 

Rolling Stone  gave the album a brief but positive review, commenting that "this album goes a long way toward capturing the gripping power and mysticism that has many fans acclaiming Genesis as 'the greatest live band ever.

A retrospective review by AllMusic was also resoundingly positive. They remarked "it's doubtful that anyone ever got a richer sound out of a Mellotron on-stage than Tony Banks does on this album, and Steve Hackett, Mike Rutherford, and Phil Collins' playing is all quite amazing as a whole unit, holding together some very complex music in a live setting". They judged all the recordings to be far superior to their studio originals.

Track listing
All songs by Tony Banks, Phil Collins, Peter Gabriel, Steve Hackett and Mike Rutherford, except "The Knife", by Banks, Gabriel, Anthony Phillips and Rutherford.

Original LP

 
2009 re-issue

 Personnel 
 Peter Gabriel – lead vocals, flute, tambourine, bass drum
 Tony Banks – Hammond organ, Mellotron, Hohner Pianet, 12-string guitar, backing vocals
 Steve Hackett – lead guitar
 Mike Rutherford – bass guitar, Dewtron "Mister Bassman" bass pedal synthesizer, 12-string guitar, backing vocals
 Phil Collins – drums, percussion, backing vocals

 Release history 
All releases of Genesis Live on Charisma Records in the U.S. were distributed by Buddah Records.

 U.S. LP releases 
 Charisma CAS-1666 (1973): first issue with large Mad Hatter label.
 Charisma CAS-1666 (1973): second issue with pink scroll label.
 Charisma CAS-1666 (1974): third issue with small Mad Hatter label.
 Atlantic 81855-1 (1982): Reissue.

 US CD releases 
 Atlantic 81855-2 (1988): First U.S. CD release.
 Atlantic 82676-2 (1994): Definitive Edition Remaster.

Charts

 References CitationsSources'

External links 

1973 live albums
Genesis (band) live albums
Atlantic Records live albums
Virgin Records live albums
Charisma Records live albums
Albums produced by Phil Collins
Albums produced by Tony Banks (musician)
Albums produced by Mike Rutherford
Albums produced by Peter Gabriel